Native currant is an Australian name for certain plants, which have smallish currant-like fruit:

 Carissa spinarum of the dogbane family (Apocynaceae)
 Coprosma quadrifida of the coffee family (Rubiaceae)
 Leucopogon parviflorus of the heather family (Ericaceae)